was a Japanese jazz trumpeter nicknamed the "Satchmo of Japan" by Louis Armstrong. He was one of Japan's first jazz musicians to become known outside his native country. A long-standing prestigious music award, "The Fumio Nanri Award", was named after him.

Life
Fumio Nanri was born at Minamikyuhoji-machi, Osaka City, Osaka Prefecture, Japan.
He was the youngest child in the six brothers/sisters and his father died after four days of his birth.
For that reason he often changed his address; Hiroshima Prefecture where his mother's family home were in, Kyoto Prefecture where the family his elder sister married into, Kobe where his elder brother lived in, and various locations.
He entered , the boys' band of Takashimaya, in 1925 after he graduated from a senior high school in Kobe.
He played at a dance hall in Kobe after the boys' band disbanded. Then he moved to Tokyo in 1928 and entered 's band (the second term of ), but mere two months after he ran away from the band.

Nanri moved to Shanghai in 1929, and studied the piano with Teddy Weatherford. In 1934 he formed his own band, Fumio Nanri and Hot Peppers, which accompanied singer  when Mine recorded.

He often came back to Japan and recorded in these years.

Nanri formed the first term of Hot Peppers in 1946.

Nanri suffered a sudden onset of optic atrophy in 1953 and nearly lost his sight. He nevertheless came back in August and he played with Louis Armstrong in December in that year when Armstrong came to Japan. Nanri played with Bobby Hackett, Clark Terry and some musicians at Trumpet Workshop to the memory of the late Louis Armstrong in 1971. Nanri always played Dixieland jazz in a straight line, however he was engaged upon bebop for a period of postwar time.

Nanri had the commemorative recital of his jazz life 48th anniversary in 1973. He held a jazz concert to support Vietnamese people in 1974. Nanri died on August 4, 1975, at the age of 64.

References

External links
THE POP LIFE; JAZZ ARTISTS PROMINENT IN U.S. - JAPANESE TRADE

Japanese jazz trumpeters
Japanese jazz bandleaders
1975 deaths
1910 births
Musicians from Osaka
20th-century Japanese musicians
20th-century trumpeters